The Scotland national under-17 rugby union team was one of several junior national rugby union teams behind the Scottish national side.

Scotland has replaced this age grade with the under-18 side.

The last time Scotland fielded an under-17 national side was in 2013.

See also

Men's National teams

Senior
 Scotland national rugby union team
 Scotland A national rugby union team
 Scotland national rugby sevens team

Development
 Scotland B national rugby union team
 Scotland Club XV

Age Grades
 Scotland national under-21 rugby union team
 Scotland national under-20 rugby union team
 Scotland national under-19 rugby union team
 Scotland national under-18 rugby union team
 Scotland national under-17 rugby union team
 Scotland national under-16 rugby union team

Women's National teams

Senior
 Scotland women's national rugby union team
 Scotland women's national rugby union team (sevens)

R